Vincent Fuller II (born August 3, 1982) is a former American football safety that played in the National Football League (NFL). He was drafted by the Tennessee Titans in the fourth round of the 2005 NFL Draft. He played college football at Virginia Tech.

Early years
Fuller played high school football at Woodlawn High School.

College career
During his career at Virginia Tech, Fuller totaled 142 tackles, a half-sack, 19 pass deflections, eight interceptions, three fumble recoveries, and returned a blocked field goal for a 74-yard touchdown, while playing in 50 games.

Professional career

Tennessee Titans
Fuller was drafted by the Titans in the fourth round (108th overall) in the 2005 NFL Draft. He was released by the Titans on September 3, 2011, in spite of offering to take a pay cut to stay on the roster.

Detroit Lions
On October 5, 2011, he signed with the Detroit Lions.

New England Patriots
On December 21, 2011, he signed with the New England Patriots, after being released from IR by the Detroit Lions. He was released on December 23, 2011.

NFL career statistics

Post-playing career
Fuller attended the Fordham University School of Law and obtained his JD. Since 2017, he has worked for Fried, Frank, Harris, Shriver & Jacobson.

Personal life
All of Fuller's younger brothers played college football at Virginia Tech as he did. His younger brother, Corey, is a free agent and was selected in the sixth round of the 2013 NFL Draft. His younger brother, Kyle, plays cornerback and was selected by the Chicago Bears in the first round of the 2014 NFL Draft. His youngest brother, cornerback Kendall, was drafted by the Washington Redskins with the 84th pick in the 2016 NFL Draft.

References

External links
Tennessee Titans bio

1982 births
Living people
Players of American football from Baltimore
American football safeties
Virginia Tech Hokies football players
Tennessee Titans players
Detroit Lions players
New England Patriots players
New York (state) lawyers
21st-century American lawyers
Fordham University School of Law alumni